Earl Ohlgren (February 21, 1918 – December 31, 1962) was a defensive end in the National Football League. He played with the Green Bay Packers during the 1942 NFL season. Previously he had played with the Milwaukee Chiefs of the American Football League.

External links

1918 births
1962 deaths
People from Cokato, Minnesota
Green Bay Packers players
Milwaukee Chiefs (AFL) players
American football defensive ends
Minnesota Golden Gophers football players